Century Tower  may refer to:
Century Tower (Beaumont) in Beaumont, Texas, U.S.
Century Tower (Chicago) in Chicago, Illinois, U.S.
Century Tower (Sydney) in Sydney, New South Wales, Australia
Century Tower (University of Florida) in Gainesville, Florida, U.S

See also

The Century Towers, in Century City, Los Angeles, U.S